"Watch Out My Children" is a song composed and recorded by the late Trinidadian calypsonian Ras Shorty I in the 1997.  It is a song telling about drug abuse.  It was translated into ten languages.

"Watch Out My Children" was adopted by the United Nations as the theme song for its campaign against the proliferation of drug abuse.

See also
 List of calypsos with sociopolitical influences

References

Ras Shorty I songs
Trinidad and Tobago songs
Songs about drugs
1997 songs